Davide Alviti (born 5 November 1996) is an Italian professional basketball player for Olimpia Milano of the Italian Lega Basket Serie A (LBA) and the EuroLeague.

National team
Alviti has been a member of Italy's national basketball team.

References

External links
FIBA profile
Profile at Eurobasket.com
Profile at Italian League website

1996 births
Living people
Forwards (basketball)
Italian men's basketball players
Olimpia Milano players
People from Alatri
Sportspeople from the Province of Frosinone